Alejandro Francisco Casañas Ramírez (born January 29, 1954) is a former Cuban hurdler.

At the 1977 Summer Universiade in Sofia he set a new world record in the 110 m hurdles with a time 13.21 seconds. This record would, however, only stand for two years. He could never fully copy the world-leading performance at the Olympic Games, where he won silver medals in 1976 and 1980.

His Cuban record time has later been improved by Anier García, Dayron Robles and Emilio Valle.

References

External links

 
 1975 Pan American 4 x 100 metres relay final

1954 births
Living people
Athletes from Havana
Cuban male hurdlers
Olympic athletes of Cuba
Olympic silver medalists for Cuba
Olympic silver medalists in athletics (track and field)
Medalists at the 1976 Summer Olympics
Medalists at the 1980 Summer Olympics
Athletes (track and field) at the 1972 Summer Olympics
Athletes (track and field) at the 1976 Summer Olympics
Athletes (track and field) at the 1980 Summer Olympics
Pan American Games gold medalists for Cuba
Pan American Games silver medalists for Cuba
Pan American Games medalists in athletics (track and field)
Athletes (track and field) at the 1971 Pan American Games
Athletes (track and field) at the 1975 Pan American Games
Athletes (track and field) at the 1979 Pan American Games
Athletes (track and field) at the 1983 Pan American Games
Universiade medalists in athletics (track and field)
Central American and Caribbean Games gold medalists for Cuba
Competitors at the 1974 Central American and Caribbean Games
Competitors at the 1978 Central American and Caribbean Games
Competitors at the 1982 Central American and Caribbean Games
Universiade gold medalists for Cuba
Central American and Caribbean Games medalists in athletics
Medalists at the 1977 Summer Universiade
Medalists at the 1975 Pan American Games
Medalists at the 1979 Pan American Games
Medalists at the 1983 Pan American Games
20th-century Cuban people